The English Football League play-offs for the 2021–22 season (referred to as the Sky Bet Play-Offs for sponsorship reasons) is being held in May 2022 with all finals being staged at Wembley Stadium in Wembley.

The play-offs begin in each league with two semi-finals which are played over two legs. The teams who finished in 3rd, 4th, 5th and 6th place in the Championship and League One and the 4th, 5th, 6th and 7th-placed teams in League Two compete. The winners of the semi-finals advance to the finals, with the winners gaining promotion for the following season.

All three play-off finals will use Video Assistant Referees (VAR), making it the first time that they have been used in each of the respective leagues.

Background 
The English Football League play-offs have been held every year since 1987. They take place for each division following the conclusion of the regular season and are contested by the four clubs finishing below the automatic promotion places. The fixtures are determined by final league position – in the Championship and League One this is 3rd v 6th and 4th v 5th, while in League Two it is 4th v 7th and 5th v 6th.

Television 
All English Football League play-off games will be broadcast live on Sky Sports. It will be simulcast on the ESPN+ streaming platform in the United States.

Championship

Semi-finals 
The final table was confirmed after the final matchday on 7 May 2022, due to Bournemouth beating Nottingham Forest on 3 May 2022; this meant that Nottingham Forest and Huddersfield Town were guaranteed to finish either 3rd or 4th and in the play-offs. Sheffield United and Luton Town won their games against Fulham and Reading respectively, because of this, Middlesbrough and Millwall were unable to qualify for the play-offs regardless of their results. It meant that Luton would play Huddersfield, and Sheffield United would play Nottingham Forest in the 1st legs, and vice versa in the 2nd legs.

First leg

Second leg 

Huddersfield Town won 2–1 on aggregate. 

3–3 on aggregate. Nottingham Forest won 3–2 on penalties.

Final 

The winner, Nottingham Forest, won promotion to the top fight after more than two decades of absence, joining Fulham and Bournemouth in being promoted to the Premier League for the 2022–23 season.

League One

Semi-finals 
The final table was confirmed after the final matchday on 30 April 2022, Milton Keynes Dons had already guaranteed a place in the play-offs and would have been promoted if they had a better result than Rotherham United. Sheffield Wednesday and Sunderland won their games against Portsmouth and Morecambe respectively to finish 4th and 5th. Wycombe Wanderers beat Burton Albion and due to Plymouth Argyle losing to MK Dons, Wycombe finished 6th and Plymouth finished 7th. It meant that Wycombe would play MK Dons and Sunderland would play Sheffield Wednesday in the first legs, and vice versa in the second legs.

First leg

Second leg 

Wycombe Wanderers won 2–1 on aggregate.

Sunderland won 2–1 on aggregate.

Final

League Two

Semi-finals 
The final table was confirmed after the final matchday on 7 May 2022, Bristol Rovers had already secured a play-off place and could still have finished 3rd and gained automatic promotion if they bettered Northampton Town's result in the last game of the season. Northampton Town and Bristol Rovers both won their games, which would have put both of them on 80 points with Northampton going up on goal difference, but due to Bristol Rovers winning their game 7–0, it put them both on a 22 goal difference, but Bristol Rovers had scored more goals than Northampton Town. This meant that against all the odds at the time, Bristol Rovers were promoted and Northampton were condemned to the play-offs. Swindon Town beat Walsall in their game, and Mansfield Town drew to champions Forest Green Rovers, which was enough to qualify for the play-offs. It meant that Mansfield Town would play Northampton and Swindon Town would play Port Vale in the 1st legs, and vice versa in the 2nd legs.

First leg

Second leg 

Mansfield Town won 3–1 on aggregate.

2–2 on aggregate. Port Vale won 6–5 on penalties.

Final

References

 
Play-offs
English Football League play-offs
EFL